Hashania is a mountainous and ethnographic region in Kosovo and Serbia. It has an area of 350 km².

Geography 
Hashania contains 9 villages, 2 of which are in Kosovo and belong to the municipality of Kamenica, they are: Kranidell and Sedllare. And 7 villages in Serbia which belong to the municipality of Bujanovac, they are:  Đorđevac,  Gornje Novo Selo, Čar, Pribovce, Ravno Bučje, Suharno and Zarbince. The Zarbica river runs through the region.

History 
During the Expulsion of the Albanians of 1877-1878 in the Sanjak of Niš, many Albanians became muhaxhirs and settled the region.

In 1948 the region had 4312 inhabitants.

Demographics 
In 1992 the region had 3202 inhabitants. Most of the inhabitans in Hashania are Muslim Albanians.

References 

Kosovo–Serbia border
Geographical regions of Kosovo
Kosovo Ethnographic Regions
Albanian ethnographic regions